The 2019–20 Northern Kentucky Norse men's basketball team represented Northern Kentucky University in the 2019–20 NCAA Division I men's basketball season. The Norse, led by first-year head coach Darrin Horn, played their home games at BB&T Arena in Highland Heights, Kentucky as members of the Horizon League. They finished the season 23–9, 13–5 in Horizon League play to finish in second place. They defeated Green Bay and UIC to become champions of the Horizon League tournament. They received the Horizon League's automatic bid to the NCAA tournament. However, the NCAA Tournament was cancelled amid the COVID-19 pandemic.

Previous season
The Norse finished the 2018–19 season 26–9 overall, 13–5 in Horizon League play, where they finished as co-regular season champions, alongside Wright State. In the Horizon League tournament, they defeated Detroit Mercy in the quarterfinals, Oakland in the semifinals, advancing to the championship game, where they faced Wright State, ultimately winning the game, to become Horizon League Tournament champions. In turn, they received the Horizon League's automatic bid to the NCAA tournament, where they lost to Texas Tech in the first round.

On April 14, 2019, it was announced that former head coach John Brannen had accepted the head coaching position at Cincinnati. On April 23, former Texas assistant Darrin Horn was named as the next head coach.

Departures

Incoming Transfers

Roster

Schedule and results

|-
!colspan=12 style=| Exhibition

|-
!colspan=12 style=| Non-conference regular season

|-
!colspan=9 style=| Horizon League regular season

|-
!colspan=12 style=| Horizon League tournament
|-

|-

Source

References

Northern Kentucky Norse men's basketball seasons
Northern Kentucky
Northern Kentucky Norse men's basketball
Northern Kentucky Norse men's basketball